Guillermo Suárez (8 September 1912 – 31 May 1947) was a Peruvian long-distance runner. He competed in the marathon at the 1936 Summer Olympics.

References

1912 births
1947 deaths
Athletes (track and field) at the 1936 Summer Olympics
Peruvian male long-distance runners
Peruvian male marathon runners
Olympic athletes of Peru
Sportspeople from Lima
20th-century Peruvian people